Professional Wrestling is a 1977 role-playing game published by Off the Wall Games.

Gameplay
Professional Wrestling is a set of rules for two or more players that allow them to use wrestling maneuvers on their opponents.

Reception
Tom Gordon reviewed Professional Wrestling in The Space Gamer No. 33. Gordon commented that "I would recommend this game to anyone who wants a change of pace. It provides real fun and is worth [the price]."

References

Role-playing games introduced in 1977